Eduard von der Hellen (October 27, 1863 – December 17, 1927) was a German archivist, editor and writer.

Von der Hellen was archivist at the Goethe Archives (later Goethe-Schiller Archives) in Weimar, and a former colleague of Rudolf Steiner.

Life 

Eduard von der Hellen was born in Gut Wellen in Wellen, today in the municipality of Beverstedt, district of Cuxhaven.

In 1894 he moved to the Nietzsche Archive, which Friedrich Nietzsche's sister Elisabeth Förster-Nietzsche had just founded in Naumburg an der Saale. This led to a dispute with Rudolf Steiner, who probably also had ambitions for the publication of Nietzsche. After only a few months, Hellen left once again the Nietzsche archive.

In 1900 he moved to Stuttgart. There he was until 1923 literary adviser of the Cotta publishing house. Von der Hellen was the main editor of the 40-volume jubilee edition of Goethe's works, which appeared in the years 1902 to 1912, as well as the sixteen-volume secular edition of Schiller's works in the years 1904 and 1905. 
He died in 1927 in Stuttgart.

Works

As author 
 Goethes Anteil an Lavaters physiognomischen Fragmenten
 Wilhelm I. und Bismarck in ihrem Briefwechsel
 Heinrich von Plate. Der Roman eines Privilegierten, Stuttgart und Berlin 1921

As editor 
 Das Journal von Tiefurt, in: Schriften der Goethe-Gesellschaft, von Bernhard Suphan (ed.), 7. Band, Weimar 1892
 Fürst Bismarcks Briefe an seine Braut und Gattin, Stuttgart 1912

External links 
 

German male writers
1863 births
1927 deaths
German archivists